Cal Slayton is an American comic book artist and Graphic Designer.

Biography
Slayton lives in Texas. His most prominent work was on the indie comic book Shades of Blue published first by AMP Comics and then by Digital Webbing. His work has also been seen in books such as Texas Zombie Wars, (Super) Hero Happy Hour, Dead@17 Rough Cut, Digital Webbing Presents and Champion of Children.

Career
His comic book debut was in 2000 with issue #3 of AMP Comic’s Shades of Blue. Writer/Creator James S. Harris asked him to take over the art duties after the departure of the original artist.

Shortly after, Cal wrote and illustrated the first story ever published by Digital Webbing in the anthology Digital Webbing Presents. The short was titled “Lost Child”, which followed a man search for a missing girl. He later published it in a mini-comic format through the creator-owned Hired Gun Comics 

Cal worked on the remaining AMP run of Shades of Blue, which ended with issue #10.  He also drew all five issue of the book when Digital Webbing took over as publisher, as well as designing the new Shades of Blue logo.

In October 2002, Cal self-published the mini comic Spookytown under the creator-owned Hired Gun Comics.

In 2003, Cal illustrated the Gail Simone-written back-up story "Part Time" for Geek Punk's Super Hero Happy Hour #4.  Later that same year, he contributed artwork to the short "No Love" for Ghostwerks Comics' Champion of Children #2.

In 2004 he drew "Two Shots, Two Slugs" for Geek Punk's Hero Happy Hour Super Special.

In 2005, he contributed art to Dead@17 Rough Cut 2 published by Viper Comics.

He designed the logo for the comic Hero Camp published by Image Comics.

He works on the comic book series Texas Zombie Wars, a companion series to the upcoming film of the same name.

He is a frequent guest at the Dallas Comic Con.

Bibliography

Interior Art

Comics containing interior sequential illustrations

AK Waters Production
Texas Zombie Wars #0-2

AMP Comics
Shades of Blue Volume 1 #3-10
Shades of Blue: The Collected Edition Volume One Trade Paperback

Digital Webbing
Digital Webbing Presents #1, #7
Shades of Blue Volume 2 #1-5
Shades of Blue: Volume One Trade Paperback

Geek Punk
Super Hero Happy Hour #4
Hero Happy Hour Super Special

Ghostwerks Comics
Champion of Children #2

Viper Comics
Dead@17: Rough Cut #2

Hired Gun Comics
Spookytown #1 mini comic

Antihero Comics
Mine All Mine
One Night Stand

Angry Dog Press
Potlatch #7

Stumblebum Studios
It Came From Stumblebum

Cover and pin-ups

Comics containing cover or pin-up illustrations

Levity Biographies
WKRP in Cincinnati (Cover)

Dork Storm
PvP #5 (back cover)

Moonstone
Voltron United and Drawn (pin-up)

Story Studios
Johnny Saturn Pinup Gallery (cover)

Geek Punk
Super Hero Happy Hour #2 (pin-up)
Super Hero Happy Hour Trade Paperback Vol. 1 (cover)

Image Comics
Dead@17 Afterbirth Trade Paperback (pin-up)
PvP: The Dork Ages Trade Paperback (pin-up)
Hero Camp #2 (pin-up)

Better Comics
Complex City: All in a Day's Work TPB (pin-up)

Half Ass Publishing
Some Big Lumberjack: Reign of the War Pig #1 (cover)

Ape Entertainment
Subculture #2 (pin-up)

Atomic Chimp Press
Hero Camp - Cool Kids Mini Trade (pin-up)

Alias Comics
OZF5: Gale Force #1 (pin-up)

Viper Comics
Karma Incorporated TPB #1 (pin-up)

Ronin Studios
Lutu: Warrior of the North #1 (pin-up)
Lutu: Warrior of the North #2 (pin-up)

Titan vs. Titan
Grave Soldiers #1 (pin-up)

References

Sources

External links

Art Blog
Official Spookytown Site
Comics Alliance Feature
Dallas Morning News Feature

1968 births
Living people
Artists from Little Rock, Arkansas
American comics artists